The Jacksonville Dolphins baseball team represents Jacksonville University, which is located in Jacksonville, Florida. The Dolphins are an NCAA Division I college baseball program that competes in the Atlantic Sun Conference. They began competing in Division I in 1969 and joined the Atlantic Sun Conference in 1999 after 20 years in the Sun Belt Conference.

The Jacksonville Dolphins play all home games on-campus at John Sessions Stadium. Since their promotion to Division I in 1969, the Dolphins have played in 14 NCAA Tournaments, advancing as far as the regional final in 1976. Over their 20 seasons in the Sun Belt Conference, they won two conference regular season titles and one conference tournament. Over their 21 seasons in the Atlantic Sun Conference (formerly the Trans America Athletic Conference), they have won two conference regular season titles and four conference tournaments.

Since the program's inception in 1957, 11 Dolphins have gone on to play in Major League Baseball, highlighted by three-time All-Star Daniel Murphy.

References

External links
 

 
1957 establishments in Florida
Baseball teams established in 1957